The Chicago, Milwaukee, St. Paul and Pacific Depot in Canton, Minnesota, United States, is a historic railway station.  It was added to the National Register of Historic Places in 2018.  The depot was built in 1881 and served the community until 1949, when the tracks were abandoned.

References

Railway stations on the National Register of Historic Places in Minnesota
Canton, Minnesota
Railway stations in the United States opened in 1881
Former railway stations in Minnesota
National Register of Historic Places in Fillmore County, Minnesota
Railway stations closed in 1949